Upper Denkyira West District is one of the twenty-two districts in Central Region, Ghana. Originally it was formerly part of the then-larger Upper Denkyira District in 1988, which was created from the former Denkyira District Council, until the northwest part of the district was split off to create Upper Denkyira West District on 29 February 2008; thus the remaining part has been renamed as Upper Denkyira East District (which it was later elevated to municipal district assembly status on that same year to become Upper Denkyira East Municipal District). The district assembly is located in the northwest part of Central Region and has Diaso as its capital town.

List of settlements

Sources
 
 District: Upper Denkyira West District

References

Central Region (Ghana)
Districts of the Central Region (Ghana)